Marina Erakovic and Tamarine Tanasugarn were the defending champions; however, they chose not to compete this year.
Shuko Aoyama and Rika Fujiwara won in the final 1–6, 6–3, [11–9], against Irina-Camelia Begu and Mădălina Gojnea.

Seeds

Draw

Draw

External links
 Main Draw

Dunlop World Challenge - Women's Doubles
Dunlop World Challenge
2010 Dunlop World Challenge